German submarine U-3515 was a Type XXI U-boat (one of the "Elektroboote") of Nazi Germany's Kriegsmarine, built for service in World War II. She was ordered on 6 November 1943, and was laid down on 27 August 1944 at F Schichau GmbH, Danzig, as yard number 1660. She was launched on 4 November 1944, and commissioned under the command of Oberleutnant zur See Fedor Kuscher on 14 December 1944.

Design
Like all Type XXI U-boats, U-3515 had a displacement of  when at the surface and  while submerged. The submarine was powered by two MAN SE supercharged six-cylinder M6V40/46KBB diesel engines each providing , two Siemens-Schuckert GU365/30 double-acting electric motors each providing , and two Siemens-Schuckert silent running GV232/28 electric motors each providing .

U-3515 was fitted with six  torpedo tubes in the bow and four  C/30 anti-aircraft guns. She could carry twenty-three torpedoes or seventeen torpedoes and twelve mines. The complement was five officers and fifty-two men.

Service history
On 9 May 1945, U-3515 surrendered at Horten, Norway. She was later transferred to Oslo on 18 May 1945, then to Scapa Flow, Scotland on 3 June, arriving on 6 June, and finally Lisahally, Northern Ireland on 8 June 1945, arriving on 9 June 1945.

Post war service
The Tripartite Naval Commission allocated U-3515 to the Soviet Union. On 2 February 1946, she arrived in Libau, Latvia, as British N-class N30. On 13 February 1946, the Soviet Navy allocated her to the Baltic Fleet. She was renamed B-30 on 9 June 1949 then sent to the reserve fleet on 29 December 1955. B-30 was redesignated on 18 January 1956, as a floating submarine battery recharging station PZS-35.  Redesignated as test hulk B-100 on 2 July 1958, until finally being struck from the Soviet Navy on 25 September 1959, and broken up for scrap on 30 November 1959.

References

Bibliography

External links
 

Type XXI submarines
U-boats commissioned in 1944
World War II submarines of Germany
1944 ships
Ships built in Danzig
Ships built by Schichau